Pyar Jhukta Nahin is a 1985 Indian Hindi-language film directed by Vijay Sadanah, starring Mithun Chakraborty, Padmini Kolhapure, Danny Denzongpa, Asrani, and Bindu. Laxmikant–Pyarelal were nominated for Best Music Director. It was a blockbuster at the box office, earning 4.5 crores with a production budget of less than 50 lakhs and the third highest-grossing movie of 1985.

The film is a remake of the 1977 Pakistani film Aina which itself was structurally similar to Aa Gale Lag Jaa. It was remade in Kannada as Nee Bareda Kadambari with Vishnuvardhan and Bhavya in the lead. It was also remade in Tamil with Rajnikant as Naan Adimai Illai co-starring Sridevi. Both remakes were directed by Dwarakish. The film was also remade in Telugu as Pachani Kapuram again starring Krishna and Sridevi. Bimal Roy Jr. adapted the film in Bengali in 1989 as Aamar Tumi starring Prosenjit Chatterjee and Farah Naaz.

Synopsis

Preeti (Padmini Kolhapure) is a rich girl who falls in love with a middle class photographer Ajay (Mithun Chakraborty). Her parents initially disagree for the marriage but the daughter manages to make them ready for the marriage. They propose Ajay to become their ghar jamai to which he refuses. Preeti's father Bhanu (Danny Dengzongpa) makes Ajay a top class photographer and his salary gets an increment. Later Ajay discovers that Bhanu has made his promotion and this has hurt his self-respect. Preeti and Ajay separate.

Although Preeti and Ajay both still love each other, Bhanu makes them have a divorce due to misunderstandings caused by him  – Bhanu makes Ajay believe Preeti wants a divorce and vice versa. Preeti is then found to be pregnant with Ajay's child. Bhanu doesn't tell this to Ajay, and instead takes Preeti to the mountains (Shimla) for the delivery so that nobody finds that she gave birth to a baby. There in the hospital, Bhanu meets Ajay and tells him about the baby. Bhanu agrees to give the baby to Ajay on the basis that Ajay never approach Preeti again, as she wants a new life with a new man. Ajay agrees, but Bhanu later changes his mind and gives the baby to an orphanage. However, Ajay follows him there and takes his own baby from the orphanage.

The story moves forward for some years and Preeti doesn't believe that her baby is dead, slowly losing her mental stability as a result. She carries a doll child in her arms, believing it to be her own son. Her parents get increasingly worried as a result. However, Preeti shows some improvement when she sees a photograph which she clicked in Shimla when she was with Ajay. The parents take her back to Shimla as a result. Ajay lives in Shimla and has brought up his child on his own. In a chance occurrence, the child meets Preeti and there is a connection between the two – with the help of Ajay, he later identifies her as his mother. He returns to her and brings her to Ajay and they solve their misunderstandings. The two expose the misunderstandings in their minds caused by Bhanu. They are able to reconcile and express their love for one another and live happily thereafter with their child.

Cast

 Mithun Chakraborty as Ajay Khanna
 Padmini Kolhapure as Preeti
 Danny Denzongpa as Bhanupratap
 Bindu as Kamini
 Master Vicky as Vicky Khanna
 Madhu Malini as Mala Mathur
 Sudha Chopra as Kamini's Sister
 Vikas Anand as Police Inspector
 Pinchoo Kapoor as Dwarka Prasad
 Manmohan Krishna as Mr. Mathur
 Roopesh Kumar as Rohit Prasad
 Chaman Puri as Shankar
 Asrani as Jackie
 Ratna Bhushan

Awards and nominations

33rd Filmfare Awards:

Nominated
 Best Actress – Padmini Kolhapure
 Best Music Director – Laxmikant Pyarelal
 Best Male Playback Singer – Shabbir Kumar for "Tumse Milkar Na Jaane"
 Best Female Playback Singer – Kavita Krishnamurthy for "Tumse Milkar Na Jaane"

Soundtrack

Trivia

Pyaar Jhukta Nahin is a remake of 1977 Pakistani movie Aina. Every scene or dialogue is lifted from this movie. Even Aina was copied from at least half dozen Hindi films and the dialogues and screenplay of Aina was copied scene by scene and dialogue by dialogue from films like Aa Gale Lag Jaa (1973), Bobby (1973), Kora Kagaz (1974), Aandhi (1975). All films take their original theme from the superhit Bollywood movie Aa Gale Lag Jaa. In the year 1977 the story was copied by a super hit film Aina. surprisingly, while the producers of Pyar Jhukta Nahin acknowledge its source of inspiration film Aina and its makers hardly ever acknowledge its source of inspiration. It was remade in Kannada as Nee Bareda Kadambari with Vishnuvardhan and Bhavya in the lead. It was also remade in Tamil with Rajnikant as Naan Adimai Illai co-starring Sridevi. Both remakes were directed by Dwarakish. The film was also remade in Telugu as Pachani Kapuram, again starring Sridevi. The film was adapted in Bengali as Amar Tumi starring Prosenjit Chatterjee and Farah Naaz in lead roles. It was directed by Bimal Roy Jr.

References

http://ibosnetwork.com/asp/filmbodetails.asp?id=Pyaar+Jhukta+Nahin

External links
 

1985 films
1980s Hindi-language films
Hindi films remade in other languages
Films scored by Laxmikant–Pyarelal
Indian remakes of Pakistani films